Ornarantia dyari is a moth in the family Choreutidae. It was described by August Busck in 1900. It is found in Florida and on the Bahamas. The species name honors entomologist Harrison Gray Dyar Jr.

The length of the forewings is 6.2 mm for males and 7.7 m for females. Adults are on wing in January, March and April in Florida and in July in the Bahamas.

The larvae feed on Ficus species. They skeletonize the leaves of their host plant.

References

Natural History Museum Lepidoptera generic names catalog

Choreutidae
Moths described in 1900
Moths of the Caribbean
Moths of North America